Rampur Dhobiya Har is a village located in Nanpara Tehsil, of Bahraich district in Uttar Pradesh, India.

About 
According to the 2011 census the location code or village code of Rampur Dhobiya Har is 171489. Rampur Dhobiya Har is located in Nanpara Tehsil of Bahraich district in Uttar Pradesh, India. It is situated 35km away from sub-district headquarter Nanpara and 70km away from district headquarter Bahraich. As per 2009 statistics, Rampur Dhobiya Har is the gram panchayat of Rampur Dhobiya Har village.

The total geographical area of village is 930.36 hectares. Rampur Dhobiya Har has a total population of 6,202 peoples. There are about 1,151 houses in Rampur Dhobiya Har village. Nanpara is nearest town to Rampur Dhobiya Har which is approximately 35km away.

Demographics 
The village is home to 6202 people, among them 3314 (53%) are male and 2888 (47%) are female. 85% of the whole population are from general caste, 15% are from schedule caste. Child (aged under 6 years) population of Rampur Dhobiya Har village is 19%, among them 53% are boys and 47% are girls. There are 1151 households in the village and an average 5 persons live in every family.

Population growth 
Population of the village has increased by 33.6% in last 10 years. In 2001 census total population here were 4643. Female population growth rate of the village is 40.5% which is 12.4% higher than male population growth rate of 28.1%. General caste population has increased by 39.8%; Schedule caste population has increased by 7% and child population has increased by 43.5% in the village since last census.

Education 
Rampur Dhobiya Har has many educational institutions, three inter colleges, and one graduate/postgraduate college.

References 

Villages in Bahraich district